Parshino is a rural locality (a village) in Orlovskoye Rural Settlement, Velikoustyugsky District, Vologda Oblast, Russia. The population was 11 as of 2002.

Geography 
The distance to Veliky Ustyug is 72 km, to Chernevo is 4 km. Marmugino is the nearest rural locality.

References 

Rural localities in Velikoustyugsky District